(28 March 1882 – 29 December 1958) was a Japanese yōga painter.

Biography
He went on to study under Kuroda Seiki and Fujishima Takeji at Tokyo School of Fine Arts, but dropped out in his first year. In the following years he contributed works to the Bunten exhibitions and travelled in Egypt, Italy, Spain, Germany, and England.

In 1918 he travelled to Korea and Manchuria. In 1921 he helped found the Bunka Gakuin. Two years later he travelled to France, Italy, and England. In 1935 he withdrew from the Nikakai and joined the Imperial Fine Arts Academy. In 1937 he became a member of the reorganised Imperial Art Academy.

After the war, he contributed works to the Nitten exhibitions, going on to become chief judge of the yōga section. He also served in a special advisory capacity after the introduction of the 1950 Law for the Protection of Cultural Properties. In December 1958, shortly before his death, he was decorated with the Order of the Rising Sun.

Select works

See also

 List of Yōga painters

References

1882 births
1958 deaths
Yōga painters
Recipients of the Order of the Rising Sun, 2nd class